Senegal competed at the 1976 Summer Olympics in Montreal, Quebec, Canada.
Senegal and Ivory Coast were the only two African nations taking part in the games. The other African countries chose to boycott the games to protest IOC's decision to allow New Zealand to compete despite the tour of its rugby team in IOC-banned South Africa.

Results by events

Athletics
Men's 4 × 100 m Relay 
 Christian Dorosario, Momar Ndao, Barka Sy, and Adama Fall
 Heat — 40.40
 Semi Final — 40.37 (→ did not advance)

Men's Long Jump
 Ibrahima Ba
 Qualification — 6.96m (→ did not advance)

Men's Discus Throw
 Ibrahima Gueye
 Qualification — 52.82m (→ did not advance)

References
Official Olympic Reports

Nations at the 1976 Summer Olympics
1976 Summer Olympics
Oly